Omsk-Passazhirsky is the primary passenger railway station for the city of Omsk in Russia, and an important stop along the Trans-Siberian Railway.

Trains

Major Domestic 
 Moscow — Vladivostok
 Chelyabinsk  — Omsk
 Omsk — Novosibirsk
 Moscow — Khabarovsk
 Moscow — Barnaul
 Moscow — Ulan Ude
 Adler — Irkutsk
 Adler — Chita

International

References

Railway stations in Omsk Oblast
Trans-Siberian Railway
Railway stations in the Russian Empire opened in 1896
1896 establishments in the Russian Empire
Objects of cultural heritage of Russia of regional significance
Cultural heritage monuments in Omsk Oblast